Harold Bishop may refer to:

Harold Bishop (American football) (born 1970), American football player
Harold Bishop (engineer), (1900–1983), broadcasting engineer
Harold Bishop, a fictional character.
Harold Bishop Elementary School

See also
Harry Bishop (disambiguation)